The Indraprastha Park is a park on the Outer Ring Road in the east of Delhi, India. It was constructed in 2004 by the Delhi Development Authority. The park includes a children's park, an amphitheatre and a food court.

A large World Peace Stupa called Shanti Stupa was opened in the park on 14 November 2007 by monks and nuns of Nipponzan Myohoji, the 14th Dalai Lama, and the Lt. Governor of Delhi.

This park was completely made from a landfill site.

References

External links

 The Hindu: New Delhi - An alternative to India Gate lawns
 The Hindu: New Delhi - Parking Blues

Parks in Delhi
2004 establishments in Delhi
Protected areas established in 2004